Stanislaus Francis Perry (May 7, 1823 – February 24, 1898) was a Canadian farmer and politician in Prince Edward Island.

Early life
He was born Stanislas-François Poirier in Tignish, Prince Edward Island, the son of Pierre Poirier and Marie-Blanche Gaudet. Poirier was educated in Tignish and then was educated in English at St. Andrew's College in Charlottetown. On his return to Tignish in 1843, he taught school. Poirier anglicized his name around this time. In 1847, he married Margaret Carroll. He was named a justice of the peace in 1851.

Political career
In 1854, Perry left teaching, began farming to support his family and entered politics. As an Acadian, he supported the redistribution of land on the island from the landowners to the tenant farmers. In 1870, he supported a coalition conservative government because it supported grants to Catholic schools. Perry was speaker in the provincial assembly from 1873 to 1874. Perry was initially opposed to Confederation but ran unsuccessfully for a seat in the House of Commons in 1873 before being elected in 1874. He was also an unsuccessful federal candidate in 1878 and 1882. He was defeated in 1896 but won the subsequent by-election after the first election was declared invalid. Perry was a proponent of a tunnel to link the island to the mainland.

He represented 1st Prince in the Legislative Assembly of Prince Edward Island from 1854 to 1875 and from 1879 to 1887 and, in the House of Commons of Canada, represented Prince County from 1874 to 1878 and from 1887 to 1896 and West Prince from 1897 to 1898 as a Liberal member. Perry (Poirier) was the first Acadian to serve in both the provincial assembly and the House of Commons.

Perry helped organize the first and second Acadian national conventions in Memramcook, New Brunswick (1881) and Miscouche, Prince Edward Island (1884) although he boycotted the second event because he wanted the event to be held in Tignish.

Death
He died in office in Ottawa in 1898 and was buried in Tignish.

Personal life
He was the grandfather of Nova Scotia Premier Angus Lewis Macdonald and is a direct ancestor of current PEI MLA Hal Perry.

References

External links 

Standardbearers of Acadian Identity, McCord Museum

1823 births
1898 deaths
People from Tignish, Prince Edward Island
Members of the House of Commons of Canada from Prince Edward Island
Liberal Party of Canada MPs
Prince Edward Island Liberal Party MLAs
Speakers of the Legislative Assembly of Prince Edward Island
Canadian Roman Catholics
Acadian people
Canadian justices of the peace